
Year 564 (DLXIV) was a leap year starting on Tuesday (link will display the full calendar) of the Julian calendar. The denomination 564 for this year has been used since the early medieval period, when the Anno Domini calendar era became the prevalent method in Europe for naming years.

Events 
 By place 
 Britain 
 Cadoc, abbot of Llancarfan (Wales), settles in Weedon and is made bishop (approximate date). 
 August 22 – Columba reports seeing the Loch Ness Monster at the River Ness (according to the "Life of St. Columba").

 Mesoamerica 
 Tulum, Maya walled city, on the Yucatán Peninsula (modern Mexico) is first mentioned on a stele inscription.

 By topic 
 Religion 
 Samson of Dol, one of seven founder saints of Brittany, attends a council in Paris and witnesses several royal decrees (approximate date).

Births 
 Hermenegild, Visigoth prince (approximate date)
 Li Baiyao, Chinese official and historian (d. 647)

Deaths 
 Gao Bainian, crown prince of Northern Qi (b. 556)
 Laisrén mac Nad Froích, Irish monk and saint
 Petroc, Celtic prince and saint (approximate date)
 Tudwal, Breton monk and saint (approximate date)

References